Sharpe House may refer to:

Parnell-Sharpe House, McGehee, Arkansas, listed on the National Register of Historic Places in Desha County, Arkansas
McLemore-Sharpe Farmstead, Vidalia, Georgia, listed on the National Register of Historic Places in Toombs County, Georgia
Sharpe Homestead and Cemetery, Defreestville, New York, listed on the National Register of Historic Places in Rensselaer County, New York
Sharpe-Gentry Farm, Propst Crossroads, North Carolina, listed on the National Register of Historic Places in Catawba County, North Carolina
Col. Silas Alexander Sharpe House, Statesville, North Carolina, listed on the National Register of Historic Places in Iredell County, North Carolina

See also
Sharp House (disambiguation)